The Zephyr Quartet is a string quartet based in Adelaide, South Australia. Founded in 1999, they have been recognised with awards and have collaborated with international musicians.

History
Founded in 1999, Zephyr has received tuition from the Takács Quartet, the Australian String Quartet and at the National Academy of Music, performed at festivals including the Adelaide Festival, Adelaide Fringe, Barossa Music Festival and the Glenelg Jazz Festival, and has presented concert series in 2004 and 2005 to great critical acclaim.

In August 2019, shortly after winning the APRA Award for Excellence by an Organisation (see below), Zephyr announced that they would be taking a pause from regular performances for a period, although not disbanding completely.

Work
Zephyr has a continuing commitment to the development and promotion of contemporary classical music and often commissions and performs works by living composers. Zephyr has been committed to presenting concerts in an education context and would often perform for primary and secondary school students as a part of the Musica Viva in Schools program.

Each member of the quartet are also experienced composers, who often contribute their own work in their concerts and recordings.

The quartet has worked with Brink Productions, Australian Dance Theatre, and an interior designer, Khai Liew. Spanning many genres of music, they have played jazz with Andrea Keller, ambient music with Stars of the Lid, post-punk with JG Thirlwell, and minimalist music with Icelandic composer Jóhann Jóhannsson.

Key people
The members of the quartet are:
Belinda Gehlert – violin
Emily Tulloch – violin
Jason Thomas - viola
Hilary Kleinig – cello

Hilary Kleinig
It was Kleinig who, when at university in 1999, asked some friends to play in a string quartet with her.

Kleining plays cello, baroque cello and viola da gamba, and has studied in Australia at the Elder Conservatorium with Niall Brown and Janis Laurs, and in the UK with Anna Shuttleworth and Alison Crumb. Her work includes performance, composition and arranging, education and arts management. She has worked in live and recorded performance as a freelance musician and in orchestras for opera, ballet and musicals. As a baroque specialist Kleinig plays with chamber ensembles such as Syntony, Adelaide Baroque, Adelaide Chamber Singers and the Australian Brandenburg Orchestra.

She also composes and arranges music for film, dance, theatre and ensembles, teaches cello and conducts ensembles.

Awards

South Australian Music Awards
The South Australian Music Awards (previously known as the Fowler's Live Music Awards) are annual awards that exist to recognise, promote and celebrate excellence in the South Australian contemporary music industry. They commenced in 2012.
 
|-
| 2018
| Zephyr Quartet
| Best International Collaboration
| 
|- 

In August 2019, the Quartet won the APRA Award for Excellence by an Organisation, a national award by the Australasian Performing Right Association, AMCOS and the Australian Music Centre in Sydney, in the Art Music Awards category. The judges' comments included: “defies genre, style and expectation”, and mentioned its 20-year history of having “fearlessly championed new Australian work” and "sustained contribution to the local, national and international arts scene”.

References

External links
 

Australian string quartets